LEAP  (Leadership, Education, and Partnership) Academy University Charter School is a charter school that serves students in kindergarten through twelfth grades from Camden, in Camden County, New Jersey, United States. The school operates under the terms of a charter granted by the New Jersey Department of Education. Founded in 1997, the school is split into three divisions, a K-6 lower school, a 7-12 upper school and a STEM high school for grades 9-12.

As of the 2021–22 school year, the school had an enrollment of 1,559 students and 102.0 classroom teachers (on an FTE basis), for a student–teacher ratio of 15.3:1. There were 1,172 students (75.2% of enrollment) eligible for free lunch and 131 (8.4% of students) eligible for reduced-cost lunch.

History
Based on an idea by Gloria Bonilla-Santiago, the school was one of the initial group of 16 statewide granted a charter by the New Jersey Department of Education and was the only school in South Jersey to be granted a charter. The school opened in September 1997 in temporary facilities with 324 students in grades K-5, who had been selected by lottery from 500 applications submitted.

The school moved to its permanent location on Cooper Street in 1999 and graduated its first eighth-grade class in July 2001, by which time the school had an enrollment of 500 students in grades K-8. The school opened for grades 9-12 with a total high school enrollment of 216 students for the 2001-02 school year under the terms of a second charter.

Awards, recognition and rankings
The school was the 213th-ranked public high school in New Jersey out of 339 schools statewide in New Jersey Monthly magazine's September 2014 cover story on the state's "Top Public High Schools".

Athletics
The LEAP Academy Lions sports programs are overseen by the New Jersey State Interscholastic Athletic Association. The school is not affiliated with a league or conference. With 350 students in grades 10-12, the school was classified by the NJSIAA for the 2019–20 school year as Group I for most athletic competition purposes, which included schools with an enrollment of 75 to 476 students in that grade range.

Administration
Core administration are

Early Learning Academy - Stephanie Rogers, Director 
Lower Elementary - Shanell Hartman, Principal
Upper Elementary/Intermediate - Jovita Veguilla, Principal
High School - Barbara Duplap, Principal

References

External links 
LEAP Academy University Charter School

LEAP Academy University Charter School, National Center for Education Statistics

1997 establishments in New Jersey
Charter schools in New Jersey
Elementary schools in New Jersey
Educational institutions established in 1997
High schools in Camden, New Jersey
Middle schools in New Jersey
Public high schools in Camden County, New Jersey